Lieutenant Commander Orme G. Stuart, DSC (20 February 1914 – 4 February 1990) was a businessperson and officer with the Royal Canadian Navy.

He served as a reservist in the Royal Canadian Navy before the Second World War and was seconded to the Royal Navy during the war.

On 9 January 1944 Commander Stuart's ship encountered a German U-boat while on convoy escort duty, and moved to attack with depth charges. Abelia was hit and lost her rudder, and the U-boat escaped.

On 8 April 1945,  was sunk off Land's End by Fitzroy and Byron. For these victories Stuart was awarded the DSC.  

After the war, he lived in Prince Rupert, British Columbia and had four children.  He also became president of the local Chamber of Commerce. He died in Vancouver in 1990.

See also
 Convoys HX 229/SC 122

References 

1914 births
1990 deaths
Canadian military personnel of World War II
Canadian recipients of the Distinguished Service Cross (United Kingdom)
People from Prince Rupert, British Columbia
Royal Canadian Navy personnel of World War II